Joseph Ellis (born 10 April 1996) is a United States born and based English international athlete. He has represented England at the Commonwealth Games.

Biography
Ellis was educated at Eastlake High School and the University of Michigan. In May of 2022, he recorded a personal best throw of 74.52 metres. 

In 2022, he was selected for the men's hammer throw event at the 2022 Commonwealth Games in Birmingham.

References

1996 births
Living people
British male hammer throwers
English male hammer throwers
British male athletes
Commonwealth Games competitors for England
Athletes (track and field) at the 2022 Commonwealth Games